William Volney Rattan (October 3, 1890 – May 6, 1985) was an American college football player and coach. He served as the head football coach at the University of Vermont form 1928 to 1929. Rattan also coached in the 1921 Far Eastern Games while stationed in the United States Army.

Head coaching record

References

External links
 

1890 births
1985 deaths
TCU Horned Frogs football players
Vermont Catamounts football coaches
People from Cooper, Texas